Obbatinewat was a 17th-century Wampanoag sachem who lived in what is now Massachusetts.

Mourt's Relation, written  and describing the early days of Plymouth Colony, has the following mention:

The image of Obbatinewat shown on this page was used as the logo of The National Shawmut Bank of Boston, later known as Shawmut Bank, until 1995 when it merged with Fleet Financial Group.  The logo is now used by Shawmut Capital Partners.

References

17th-century Native Americans
Native American leaders
Wampanoag people
Year of birth unknown
Year of death unknown
Native American people from Massachusetts
Native American history of Massachusetts